The 2016 Reading Borough Council election took place on 5 May 2016 to elect members of Reading Borough Council in England. The election for Police and Crime Commissioner was held on the same day. The Labour Party increased their borough-wide vote by over 7% and held on to marginal seats in Church, Kentwood and Caversham, the latter receiving the highest number of votes recorded for any candidate at this election .

After the election, the composition of the council was:

Election result

Ward results

Abbey

Battle

Caversham

Church

Katesgrove

Kentwood

Mapledurham

Minster

Norcot

Park

Peppard

Redlands

Southcote

Thames

Tilehurst

Whitley

References

2016 English local elections
2016
2010s in Berkshire